Tuado (also, Tşado) is a village and municipality in the Lankaran Rayon of Azerbaijan.  It has a population of 585.

References 

Populated places in Lankaran District